Same Name is an American reality television series in which an average person swaps lives with a celebrity of the same first name and surname. It premiered on July 24, 2011 on CBS. The series received low ratings, and CBS pulled it after four-episodes from its Sunday night line-up.

Premise
On the series, two people with the same name switch lives.  One person is a well-known celebrity, while the other person is an ordinary individual who simply shares the first and last name of the celebrity.

By the end of the episode, they resume their original lives, and comment how they enjoyed the experience and how they did not.

Promotions
In an episode of CBS' Big Brother 13 (which aired just prior to the show's premiere), the show was promoted during a luxury competition using both the celebrity David Hasselhoff, and the regular-guy David Hasselhoff.  The celebrity Hasselhoff later entered the Big Brother house for a cameo appearance.

Episode list

References

2010s American reality television series
2011 American television series debuts
CBS original programming
2011 American television series endings
English-language television shows
Television series by 51 Minds Entertainment